German submarine U-592 was a Type VIIC U-boat of Nazi Germany's Kriegsmarine during World War II.

The boat was sunk by depth charges from British warships on 31 January 1944.

Design
German Type VIIC submarines were preceded by the shorter Type VIIB submarines. U-592 had a displacement of  when at the surface and  while submerged. She had two shafts and two  propellers.

U-592 was fitted with five  torpedo tubes (four fitted at the bow and one at the stern), fourteen torpedoes, one  SK C/35 naval gun, 220 rounds, and a  C/30 anti-aircraft gun. The boat had a complement of between forty-four and sixty.

Service history
The submarine was laid down on 30 October 1940 at Blohm & Voss, Hamburg as yard number 568, launched on 20 August 1941 and commissioned on 16 October under the command of Kapitänleutnant Carl Borm.

She served with the 6th U-boat Flotilla from 16 October 1941 for training and stayed with that organization for operations from 1 February 1942. She was reassigned to the 11th flotilla on 1 July, then back to the sixth flotilla from 1 March 1943.

First and second patrols
U-592s first patrol was preceded by a short trip from Hamburg to the German-controlled island of Helgoland, (also known as Heligoland), in February 1942. The patrol itself commenced on 3 March. She steamed up the Norwegian side of the North Sea and arrived at Bergen on 23 March.

For her second foray, she covered the Norwegian and Barents Seas.

Third patrol
Her third sortie was preceded by brief voyages from Bergen to Hamburg, then Kiel and back to Bergen. The patrol itself commenced with the boat's departure from the Norwegian port on 17 July 1942. She covered vast swathes of the Norwegian Sea before putting into Skjomenfjord, (south of Narvik), on 14 August.

Fourth patrol
U-592 covered the areas toward Spitsbergen (Svalbard) and Iceland.

Fifth patrol
The boat left Skjomenfjord on 7 October 1942. On the 14th, she scored her only success when she sank the Soviet ship Shchors with a mine off the western entrance to the Yugar Strait.

Sixth patrol
This patrol, in November and December 1942, was relatively uneventful. The boat moved from Narvik to Bergen in mid-December.

Seventh patrol
U-592 left Bergen on 9 March 1943, bound for the French Atlantic coast. Moving through the gap between Iceland and the Faroe Islands, she entered the Atlantic Ocean and patrolled southeast of Greenland before entering St. Nazaire on 18 April.

Eight and ninth patrols
These two sorties were also fairly trouble-free; between May and November 1943.

Tenth patrol and loss
The submarine had left St. Nazaire on 10 January 1944.

Forty-nine men died with U-592; there were no survivors.

Wolfpacks
U-592 took part in 16 wolfpacks, namely:
 Wrangel (11 – 18 March 1942) 
 Naseweis (10 April 1942) 
 Bums (10 – 14 April 1942) 
 Blutrausch (15 – 19 April 1942) 
 Nebelkönig (27 July – 13 August 1942) 
 Trägertod (19 – 22 September 1942) 
 Boreas (19 November – 9 December 1942) 
 Seeteufel (21 – 30 March 1943) 
 Löwenherz (1 – 10 April 1943) 
 Siegfried (22 – 27 October 1943) 
 Siegfried 2 (27 – 30 October 1943) 
 Jahn (31 October – 2 November 1943) 
 Tirpitz 4 (2 – 8 November 1943) 
 Eisenhart 8 (9 – 10 November 1943) 
 Rügen (21 – 26 January 1944) 
 Hinein (26 – 29 January 1944)

Summary of raiding history

References

Bibliography

External links

German Type VIIC submarines
U-boats commissioned in 1941
U-boats sunk in 1944
U-boats sunk by depth charges
1941 ships
Ships built in Hamburg
Ships lost with all hands
U-boats sunk by British warships
World War II shipwrecks in the Atlantic Ocean
World War II submarines of Germany
Maritime incidents in January 1944